Jamia Masjid Gulbarga is a mosque located in Gulbarga, Karnataka, India.

It was built by Bahamani Sultan Mohammad Shah after he defeated kapaya nayaka of warangal. It is regarded as one of the best examples of mosque architecture in South Asia. The arches design of Jamia Masjid Gulbarga reflects in the interiors of Spanish Mosque of Hyderabad, India. These are only two mosques in India which have interiors similar to the Great Cathedral–Mosque of Córdoba in Spain.

The complex was put by UNESCO on its "tentative list" to become a World Heritage Site in 2014, with others in the region, under the name Monuments and Forts of the Deccan Sultanate (despite there being a number of different sultanates).

Architecture

The Jama Masjid Gulbarga does not have minarets. It is built inside the Gulbarga Fort.Interesting highlights about Jama Masjid, Gulbarga

Built  in 1367 AD, designed by a Persian architect, Rafi
Two huge black stone carved water storage vessels near the entrance, to help visitors purify themselves before prayer.
50 feet high main entrance and 250 arches across the mosque
Roof consisting of one large dome at the centre, four medium sized domes at each corner and 107 smaller domes
Timings: Jama Mosque in Gulbarga can be accessed from 9 AM till 5 PM on all days except Saturday.

Nearby: Yadagiri Fort (85 kms), Basavakalyana (82 kms) can be visited along with Kalaburagi.

How to reach Gulbarga (Kalaburagi): Kalaburagi is 575 kms from Bengaluru. Kalaburagi has an airport, 15 kms from city centre, with 3 times a week flight from Bengaluru. Bidar is another airport 110 kms from Kalaburagi. Kalaburagi has a railway station and good bus connectivity from various parts of Karnataka.

See also
Gulbarga District
Gulbarga Fort
Spanish Mosque

Gallery

References

External links

"City of tombs and domes," The Hindu Daily

Kalaburagi
Mosques in Karnataka
Buildings and structures in Kalaburagi district
Religious buildings and structures completed in 1367
Gulbarga
Bahmani architecture